Ryan Nichols may refer to:

Ryan Nichols (Halloween character), on List of Halloween (franchise) characters#Ryan Nichols
Ryan Nichols (V character), on List of V (2009 TV series) episodes

See also
Ryan Nicholls, Welsh footballer